The western angelshark (Squatina pseudocellata) is an angelshark of the family Squatinidae found on the tropical outer continental shelf off northern Western Australia, at depths of .

Reproduction is ovoviviparous, with up to 20 pups in a litter.

References

 Compagno, Dando, & Fowler, Sharks of the World, Princeton University Press, New Jersey 2005 

western angelshark
Marine fish of Western Australia
Vertebrates of Western Australia
western angelshark
western angelshark